The World Group was the highest level of Fed Cup competition in 1995. Eight nations competed in a three-round knockout competition. Spain was the two-time defending champion, and successfully defended their title defeating last year's finalist United States in what was their fifth consecutive final.

Participating Teams

Draw

First round

Spain vs. Bulgaria

Japan vs. Germany

France vs. South Africa

Austria vs. United States

Semifinals

Spain vs. Germany

France vs. United States

Final

Spain vs. United States

References

See also
Fed Cup structure

World Group